The 1983 Southern Illinois Salukis football team was an American football team that represented Southern Illinois University (now known as Southern Illinois University Carbondale) in the Missouri Valley Conference (MVC) during the 1983 NCAA Division I-AA football season.  Under eighth-year head coach Rey Dempsey, the team compiled a 13–1 record, finished second in the MVC, and won the NCAA Division I-AA Championship, defeating  in the 1983 NCAA Division I-AA Football Championship Game. The team played its home games at McAndrew Stadium in Carbondale, Illinois.

Schedule

References

Southern Illinois
Southern Illinois Salukis football seasons
NCAA Division I Football Champions
Southern Illinois Salukis football